Aarflot is a Norwegian surname. Notable people with the surname include:

Andreas Aarflot (born 1928), Norwegian theologian and bishop
Berte Canutte Aarflot (1795–1859), Norwegian hymnwriter
Johannes Aarflot (1824–1891), Norwegian politician and businessman
Mauritz Aarflot (1821–1904), Norwegian politician and editor
Rasmus Aarflot (1792–1845), Norwegian politician and editor
Sivert Aarflot (1759–1817), Norwegian educator and printer

Norwegian-language surnames